Ahmad Baghbanbashi Doust (born 31 March 1972) is an Iranian professional futsal coach and former player.

Honours

Player

Country 
 AFC Futsal Championship
 Champion (2): 1999 - 2000

Club 
 AFC Futsal Club Championship
 Champion (1): 2010 (Foolad Mahan) 
 Iranian Futsal Super League
 Champion (2): 2008–09 (Foolad Mahan) - 2009–10 (Foolad Mahan)

Manager 

 Iranian Futsal Super League
 Champion (1): 2020–21 (Mes Sungun) 
 Iran Futsal's 2nd Division
 Champion (1): 2011 (Foolad Mahan Novin)

References

External links 
 

1972 births
Living people
Sportspeople from Isfahan
Iranian footballers
Iranian men's futsal players
Association football forwards
Iranian futsal coaches
Sepahan S.C. footballers
Zob Ahan Esfahan F.C. players
Esteghlal FSC players
Foolad Mahan FSC players